Senator Galloway may refer to:

Abraham Galloway (1837–1870), North Carolina State Senate
Michael Galloway (politician) (born 1965), Texas State Senate
Pam Galloway (born 1955), Wisconsin State Senate
Shirley Galloway (born 1934), Washington State Senate